Metlapilcoatlus is a genus of venomous pit vipers endemic to Mexico and Central America. Six species are currently recognized. The common names suggest they are able to leap at an attacker, but this is likely exaggerated. Common names for the species include jumping pitvipers and jumping vipers. The genus name comes from the Nahuatl name metlapilcohuatl, which means of the oblong grindstone held in the hand when grinding corn - alluding to the snakes short stocky body.

Description
All of these snakes are extremely thick-bodied, with M. nummifer being the most stout. The head is large, with small eyes and a broadly rounded snout. The tail is short, not prehensile, and accounts for only 15% of the total length.

The color pattern usually consists of a gray-brown or reddish brown ground color (sometimes yellow, cream, purplish brown or black), overlaid with a series of lateral and dorsal blotches. The shape of these blotches is subject to some variation, but is sometimes still helpful for identification.

Geographic range
Found in the mountains of eastern Mexico southeastward on the Atlantic versant and lowlands though Central America to central Panama. On the Pacific versant, they occur in isolated populations in east-central and southern Mexico, Guatemala, El Salvador, Costa Rica and Panama.

Behavior
The common name alludes to the supposed ability these snakes have to launch themselves at an attacker during a strike, thereby bridging a distance that is equal to or greater than the length of the body. Mehrtens (1987) states that they live up to their name, striking at their assailants with such force that they actually leave the ground. Campbell and Lamar (2004), on the other hand, describe this as greatly exaggerated, saying that actually these snakes are only able to strike about half of their own body length. In addition, they describe them as slow moving and non-aggressive. However, when provoked all species will put on a rather dramatic open-mouthed threat display.

These snakes may be active both during the day and at night. On the other hand, populations found at higher altitudes seem to be active only during daylight hours and never at night.

Feeding
Adults feed mainly on small mammals and lizards, while juveniles feed on orthopterans and skinks.

Venom
Unlike most vipers, members of this genus will strike and then hold on and chew. In one case, a machete was used to pry off the jaws. March (1929) wrote that M. mexicanus (M. nummifer) will hang on and make half a dozen punctures unless quickly and forcibly removed. However, the effects of the venom include only transient pain and mild swelling. In one part of Honduras the locals even insist that the snake (M. nummifer) is not venomous. Laboratory studies suggest that Metlapilcoatlus venoms are unlikely to lead to consumption coagulopathy and incoagulable blood in humans.

Species

*) Not including the nominate subspecies.
T) Type species.

References

Further reading

 March DDH. 1929. Notes on Bothrops nummifera, mano de piedra or timbo. Bulletin of the Antivenin Institute of America. 2(3): 58.
 Müller JW von. 1865. Vol. 3. Reisen in den Vereinigten Staten, Canada und Mexico. Beitrage zur geschichte, statistik und zoologie von Mexico. F.A. Brockhaus, Leipzig. xiv, pp. 595–619[613].
 Rüppell E. 1845. Verzeichnis der in dem Museum der Senckenbergischen naturforschenden Gesellschaft aufgestellten Sammlungen. Dritte Abteilung: Amphibien. Museum Senckenbergianum 3: 293-318[313].
 Werman SD. 1992. Phylogenetic relationships of Central and South American pitvipers of the genus Bothrops (sensu lato): cladistic analyses of biochemical and anatomical characters. pp. 21–40[21, 34]. In Campbell JA, Brodie Jr. ED. 1992. Biology of the Pitvipers. Texas: Selva. 467 pp. 17 plates. .

External links
 
 Video: Herpetologist Austin Stevens  shares his canteen with a jumping pit viper at Austin Stevens: Snakemaster. Accessed 2 November 2006.

 
Snake genera